Danis Christopher Ramírez (born February 2, 1990, in San Salvador) is a Salvadoran professional footballer.

Club career

Atlético Marte
Ramírez began his career in the reserve team of Atlético Marte, before joining the main squad in 2011.

During his four years there he played 98 games and scored 29 goals, becoming their highest goalscorer in the Apertura/Clausura format for the team.

Orange County Blues FC
He signed for the Orange County Blues FC of the USL in 2015, where he scored 8 goals in 25 appearances and achieved 1st place in the Western Conference.

In December, his loan expired and he returned to Atlético Marte.

Return to Atlético Marte
Ramírez returned to Atlético Marte for the Clausura 2016, but the team ended up descending to Segunda División at the end of the tournament.

Alianza
In May 2016, Ramírez signed with Alianza for the Apertura 2016 tournament.

Loan to Sonsonate
In 2017, Ramírez played a loan with Sonsonate.

Luis Ángel Firpo
In 2018, Ramírez signed with Luis Ángel Firpo. With the team of Usulután, Ramírez experienced a serious institutional, economic and sports crisis, in addition to arrears in salary payments. Despite this, Ramírez became one of the team's top scorers in the Apertura 2018 with 9 goals.

Ramírez scored a hat-trick in a 3–4 defeat against Isidro Metapán at the Estadio Cuscatlán in August 2018. In December 2018, Ramírez's contract was not renewed by Luis Ángel Firpo.

Honors
 Orange County Blues
 United Soccer League Western Conference (Regular Season) (1): 2015

References

1990 births
Living people
Salvadoran footballers
Salvadoran expatriate footballers
C.D. Atlético Marte footballers
Orange County SC players
Association football forwards
Expatriate soccer players in the United States
USL Championship players